Harry S. Coombs (1878-1939) was an American architect practicing in Lewiston, Maine. He was the son of and successor to architect George M. Coombs.

Biography
Harry Coombs was born in 1878 to George M. Coombs, a partner in the leading Lewiston architectural firm of Stevens & Coombs. He attended the public schools, before moving on to Bowdoin College. He graduated in 1901, and immediately entered his father's office, now Coombs & Gibbs.  He worked with his father until his death in May 1909, at which point he gained his father's share in the partnership. Coombs & Gibbs was dissolved sometime in 1910, breaking into two firms, Coombs Brothers and Gibbs & Pulsifer. Coombs Brothers was composed of Harry Coombs and his brother, Frederick N. Coombs. They split in 1912, and Harry continued on his own. In 1928 he made Alonzo J. Harriman a partner, and Coombs & Harriman lasted until the former's death in 1939.

Legacy
After Coombs' death, Harriman relocated the office to Auburn, where it is still in operation as Harriman Architects + Engineers.

At least nine of his designs have been individually placed on the National Register of Historic Places, and several others contribute to listed historic districts.

Style
Prior to the 1930s, almost all of Coombs' work was in the Colonial Revival style. Larger examples of this are his administration building at the Central Maine General Hospital, the Rumford Municipal Building, Stearns High School at Millinocket, and the former Lewiston High School. He designed very few Gothic Revival buildings, and those that are known were all built in the first few years of his practice. Of these, the Franklin School in Auburn is most notable. Beginning in the 1930s, Coombs and his partner Harriman began to adopt the Art Deco style for many of their works, most significantly the hospital at Togus and the since-demolished High School at Brunswick.

Architectural works

Coombs & Gibbs, 1909-1910
 1909 - Gray and Lisbon Halls, Maine School for the Feeble-Minded, New Gloucester, Maine
 1910 - Callahan Block, 282 Lisbon St, Lewiston, Maine

Coombs Brothers, 1910-1912
 1910 - Viola V. Coombs House, 33 Main St, Bowdoinham, Maine
 1911 - Hartwell Frederick House, 23 Chapel St, Augusta, Maine
 1911 - Sisters of St. Dominic Home, 56 Birch St, Lewiston, Maine
 1912 - Bates Street Shirt Factory, 29 Lowell St, Lewiston, Maine

Harry S. Coombs, 1912-1928
 1912 - Dalton Holmes Davis Memorial Library, 6 Goodspeed St, Bridgton, Maine
 1912 - Fort Fairfield Public Library, 339 Main St, Fort Fairfield, Maine
 1913 - Central Building, Central Maine General Hospital, 300 Main St, Lewiston, Maine
 1913 - Chamberlain (Franklin) School, 23 High St, Auburn, Maine
 1913 - Colonial Theater, 139 Water St, Augusta, Maine
 1914 - Oakland Public Library, 18 Church St, Oakland, Maine
 1915 - Goodspeed Memorial Library, 104 Main St, Wilton, Maine
 1915 - Rumford Municipal Building, 145 Congress St, Rumford, Maine
 1915 - Webster School, 95 Hampshire St, Auburn, Maine
 1916 - Plymouth Hotel, 303 Main St, Fort Fairfield, Maine
 Demolished
 1917 - Hotel Herbert (Herbert Grand Hotel), 246 Main St, Kingfield, Maine
 1918 - N. H. Fay High School, 174 Free St, Dexter, Maine
 1919 - Gardiner High School, 25 Pleasant St, Gardiner, Maine
 Demolished in 1992
 1920 - Tyson Hall, Augusta State Hospital, Augusta, Maine
 1922 - Atherton Building, 42 Free St, Portland, Maine
 1922 - C. K. Burns School, 135 Middle St, Saco, Maine
 1923 - George W. Stearns High School, 80 Maine Ave, Millinocket, Maine
 1925 - Nurses' Home, Webber Hospital (Old), 15 Amherst St, Biddeford, Maine
 1926 - Norway National Bank Building, 369 Main St, Norway, Maine
 1927 - Nurses' Home, Augusta State Hospital, Augusta, Maine

Coombs & Harriman, 1928-1939
 1930 - Lewiston High School (Former), 75 Central Ave, Lewiston, Maine
 1931 - Auburn Hall, Pownal State School, New Gloucester, Maine
 The school's hospital facility.
 1931 - Hotel Harris (Rebuilding), 25 Hartford St, Rumford, Maine
 1932 - Togus VA Hospital, Pond Rd, Chelsea, Maine
 1933 - Coolidge Library, 17 S Main St, Solon, Maine
 1935 - Mexico High School, 15 Recreation Dr, Mexico, Maine
 1936 - Brunswick High School, 44 McKeen St, Brunswick, Maine
 Demolished in 2009
 1936 - Lamey-Wellehan Store, 110 Lisbon St, Lewiston, Maine

References

1846 births
1928 deaths
Architects from Maine
Bowdoin College alumni
People from Lewiston, Maine